Naqeebabad Sharif or Astana-e-Aliya Naqeeb Abad Sharif (also referred to as Dargah Naqeeb ul Auliya) is an Islamic Spiritual site located at Lahore-Kasur Highway. The dargah site is famous for being the center of the famous spiritual sufi chain "Naqeebia". 

The tombs of Faqeer Sufi Muhammad Naqeeb Ullah Shah and Sufi Muhammad Azmat Ullah Shah are located at Naqeebabad Sharif. The tombs are visited daily by local and foreign visitors. The tombs are constantly surrounded by much recitation of the Qur'an & Zikr (mention of God) by both visitors and locals. In 2016, after the passage of Sufi Muhammad Azmat Ullah Shah, he was buried there, next to the tomb of his father Faqeer Sufi Muhammad Naqeeb Ullah Shah.

The site is also famous for the Islamic architecture, mosque and monuments that are constructed on the site. A mosque is also constructed at the site named Sunheri Naqeebia Mosque. It was constructed by Sufi Naqeeb Ullah Shah and his son Muhammad Azmat Ullah Shah. This mosque is a prestige representation of Islamic architecture and presents an esteemed view to the visitors.

Various religious, spiritual and cultural events are held at the Darga Naqeeb ul auwaliya throughout the year. In these events, participants and artists from different parts of world came to the shrine to present their tribute to their sheikh by reciting Quran, Naats, Nasheeds and Qawwali. Jashan-e-Naqeebi (Annual Urs Celebration of Faqeer Sufi Naqeeb Ullah Shah), Jashan-e-Azmat ul Auwaliya (Annual Urs Celebration of Azmat ullah Shah), Jashan Jahangeeri are the most awaited and honorific events that held at Naqeeb Abad Sharif.

References 

Lists of religious buildings and structures in Pakistan